Stadio Romeo Malservisi is a multi-use stadium in Gavorrano, Italy.  It is currently used mostly for football matches and is the home ground of U.S. Gavorrano.  The stadium holds 2,000.

Gallery

External links
Stadio Romeo Malservisi at Soccerway.com

Romeo Malservisi
Sports venues in Tuscany
Gavorrano